is a Japanese singer and the daughter of actress Yukiko Kashiwagi and singer Kyu Sakamoto.

Biography 
Oshima was born in Tokyo, and is a graduate of Toyo Eiwa University. When she was 11 years old, her father, Kyu Sakamoto, was killed in the plane crash. In October 2006 it was revealed that she was going to get married. In January 2007 she married the head of a Brazilian jujitsu dojo in Hawaii.  On February 17, 2009, their first child, a boy, was born.

Filmography 
 1995 – Himeyuri no tō (ひめゆりの塔)

Books 
 1997, Egao no okurimono- Sakamoto Kyū shashinshū (笑顔の贈り物―坂本九写真集/The gift of a smiling face – Kyu Sakamoto photograph collection)

References

External links
 Hanako Cafe the official Hanako Oshima website
 JAM HOUSE, where Hanako plays live

1973 births
Living people
Japanese-language singers
Japanese women pop singers
Japanese women singer-songwriters
Japanese singer-songwriters
Japanese actresses
Singers from Tokyo
21st-century Japanese singers
21st-century Japanese women singers